The June Foray Award is a juried award given to individuals in recognition of a significant and benevolent or charitable impact on the art and industry of animation. The award is given by the International Animated Film Association, ASIFA-Hollywood at the annual Annie Awards since 1995. It is named after the voice actress June Foray.

Award recipients

See also

 List of animation awards

References

External links
June Foray Award at Annie Awards. 
ASIFA-Hollywood official site

Annie Awards
American film awards
Awards established in 1995
1995 establishments in the United States
Lifetime achievement awards